Who Fears Death is a science fantasy novel by Nigerian-American writer Nnedi Okorafor, published in 2010 by DAW, an imprint of Penguin Books. It was awarded the 2011 World Fantasy Award for Best Novel, as well as the 2010 Carl Brandon Kindred Award "for an outstanding work of speculative fiction dealing with race and ethnicity." Okorafor wrote a prequel,  the novel The Book of Phoenix, published by DAW in 2015.

The novel takes place in a post-apocalyptic Africa specifically Sudan, where the light-skinned Nuru oppress the dark-skinned Okeke.

In 2023, Okorafor announced her upcoming novella trilogy She Who Knows which would serve as a prequel and sequel to her 2010 novel Who Fears Death and would focus on the life of Najeeba, Onyesonwu's mother. The first novella is scheduled for publication in 2024.

Plot
The novel follows the protagonist, Onyesonwu (Igbo for "who fears death"), who is an Ewu, i.e. the child of an Okeke woman raped by a Nuru man. On reaching maturity, she goes on a quest to defeat her sorcerous father Daib using her magical powers. The novel is narrated by Onyesonwu to a journalist who interviews her before her execution. It is divided into three parts.

Part I 
The novel opens with the death of Onyesonwu's Father, which occurs when Onyesonwu was sixteen. The plot shifts back to her arrival in Jwahir. Onyesonwu  is a product of rape, her mother Najeeba's was raped alongside other Okeke women by a Nuru man when her village was attacked and destroyed by the Nurus.

Onyesonwu grows up in Jwahir after spending six years in the desert alone with her mother. She doesn't fit with the town people and is often ostracized because she is an Ewu. Onye meets a blacksmith named Fadil Ogundimu who treats her well, and eventually marries her mother.  Onyesonwu undergoes female circumcision at eleven in an attempt to become normal and accepted by the community against her parents wishes, giving her biological father the chance to haunt her. She bonds closely with the three other girl who undergoes the rites; Binta, Diti, and Luyu. Soon after the rite, an Ewu boy named Mwita arrives at school. Mwita and Onyesonwu befriends each other because of their shared status and shared powers, but Onyesonwu is skeptical about him because Mwita is trained by Aro, the local sorcerer, who refuses to coach her because she is a girl. After Onyesonwu father's burial Aro decides to coach her.

Part II 
Onyesonwu's return to school days later after her father's death. She goes through a terrifiying initiation which is literally her own death. She bonds with Mwita and develops her powers of shape shifting, resurrecting creatures, traveling to the ‘wilderness’ (spirit world) and she regrows her clitoris.

Onyesonwu's apprenticeship ends when she is mocked at the market and uses her abilities to make the mockers relive her mother's rape. After this, she leaves Jwahir and moves to help the Okeke in the west of the desert. Mwita, Binta, Diti, Luyu, and Diti's fiancé Fanasi decide to travel with her. On the way, Onyesonwu asks for direction to find the Nuru man prophesied by a Seer to rewrite the Great Book and she discovers that it was she who has been prophesied to rewrite the Great Book which justifies the oppression of the Okeke people and stop the Nuru attack in the west. The Seer was afraid to admit that an Ewu woman will change everything so he switched the race and gender.

Part III 
Tension grows among the group due to the harshness of the desert and Luyu and Fanasi begin to have an affair after Onyesonwu regrows her friends clitoris despite Fanasi's betrothal to Diti. They reach a supply town where Onyesonwu and Mwita are stoned because of their Ewu status and Binta is killed in the process. Onyesonwu, out of rage, blinds everyone in the town. After Binta's death, they encounter the Vah, a tribe who travels in the sandstorm. The Vah invites the group to stay with them for the three weeks they plan on remaining there. Onyesonwu discusses with the goddess Ani and she meets a Kponyungo (dragon like creature) who takes her to the east. Onyesonwu's spirit travels to the west and attacks Diab but Diab uses an evil juju to poison her.

Diti and Fanasi return to Jwahir after the Vah sorcerers heal Onyesonwu and the others continue on their journey. Onyesonwu, Luyu and Mwita reach ruined Okeke villages and people and Onyesonwu heals the sick among them. They reach Durfa, where Onyesonwu attacks Diab and Mwita is killed by him. Onyesonwu uses her ability to move one of her eggs towards Mwita's sperm causing an explosion which injures Diab and eventually leads to his death.

Luyu and Onyesonwu discover that the blast killed all fertile men around the region and impregnated all the fertile women. They both flee to an island where Onyesonwu finds the Great Book. She rewrites it with a magical script called Nsibidi. The remaining Nuru men reach the island, kill Luyu and takes Onyesonwu prisoner.

The epilogue, narrated by a Nuru who interviewed Onyesonwu, asserts that she was stoned to death and explains how he worked with his sister to dig her body. While a narration of the last two chapters by Sola describes Onyesonwu escaping execution by transforming into a Kponyungo and flying east to meet Mwita.

Characters 
  Onyesonwu Ubaid-Ogundimu: The protagonist, she is a strong and fierce Ewu girl whose Okeke mother was raped by a Nuru man. Onyesonwu is also a sorceress and an Eshu (shapeshifter). She is used to being ostracized by most people through her life and does not fit in with the society. After her Eleventh Year Rite, her rapist father Diab begins to haunt her and she heads to the West to rewrite the Great Book and kill him. While waiting for her execution, she narrates the entire story to a man.
 Mwita: An Ewu boy who is the love interest of Onyesonwu. Unlike most Ewu, Mwita was created from a love affair between an Okeke slave and Nuru man who were both stoned to death. He grew up as a Nuru and was mentored by Diab before becoming child soldier for the Okeke rebels. He was mentored by Aro when he escaped and arrived in Jwahir.
 Najeeba: Onyesonwu's mother, an Okeke woman who was raped by a Nuru man. She was rejected by her first husband and gave birth to Onyesonwu alone in the desert where she lived for six years before settling at Jwahir. In the later years, she learns juju and goes around telling people all over the world about Onyesonwu.
 Aro: Onyesonwu's mentor, he is one of the seven elders of Jwahir and an Eshu. Aro ran from his hometown of Gadi as an eagle for several decades before settling in Jwahir. His views about the society are often patriarchal and he refuses to teach Onyesonwu juju for three years.
 Luyu: Onyesonwu's friend, Luyu is strong and determined to help Onyesonwu in any possible way she can even though she has no juju. Luyu is known for her numerous affairs with men including a relationship with Fanasi. Onyesonwu confides in her the most.
 Binta: Onyesonwu's best friend, she understand Onyesonwu more than the Luyu and Diti. She is a survivor of rape by her own father who couldn't resist her, Binta secretly kill him before embarking on the journey.
 Diti: Onyesonwu's friend, she comes from a rich family and often behaves awkwardly compared to Luyu and Binta. She is engaged to Fanasi and often complains a lot during the journey to the West and she eventually head back home to Jwahir with Fanasi.
 Fanasi: Diti's fiancé, he actually embarked on the journey to the West because of Diti and finds himself in an extramarital relationship with Luyu. He eventually leaves the group.
 Diab: Onyesonwu's biological father and a powerful sorcerer. He is a military leader of the Nuru people and has been working tirelessly to bring an army to the East to destroy the Okeke people. Diab is also known for his ability to torture people and draw reptiles to him while singing.
 Sola: A mysterious man who was once Diab's mentor and a close friend of Aro. His skin is described as being so white that Onyesonwu even wonder at times if he is human.

Locations/Settings

Jwahir 
A desert town In the East populated by the Okeke where Onyesonwu grew up and spent most of her life with her mother. Due to the distance of The Seven Rivers Kingdoms from Jwahir, the town is generally peaceful. In order to be fully accepted into the society, all eleven years old girls are expected to go through their Eleventh Year Rite which basically involves female circumcision. The girls are also given small diamonds called "talembe etanou" which should be in their mouth until death and waist chains. Onyesonwu is ostracized in the community because of her ewu status even after passing through the rite. The town is governed by the Osugbo, a group of elders who keep law and order.

Banza  
A huge Okeke town of art and culture located in the middle of the desert. It is well developed having a paved highway and residential area, electricity as well as a huge market. Unlike Jwahir, Ewu people are not ostracized and are considered to be prostitutes, a hotel for Ewu women is located in the town. Its residents are known for their lust, evil and wayward ways of life. Onyesonwu was nearly raped in the town and the resident did nothing but watch the events.

Papa Shee 
A supplies town where free Okeke and Nuru live together. Onyesonwu and Mwita was stoned by the residents because of their ewu status and in the process Binta was killed. Onyesonwu out of rage made the entire residents blind including children and babies. It is now called "The Town of the Sightless".

Ssolu 
The moving village of the mythological Red People, it consists of tents set up by them in the middle of the dust storm of which is controlled by the village chief. The dust storm protects the village from the outside world. There is also a moving school in the village for children. Juju is an important aspect of the community.

Gadi 
A war torn village that was previously dominated by Okeke slaves. The Nuru attacked the defenseless Okeke who are trying to defend themselves. The Nuru men also engaged in raping the defenseless Okeke women as part of their plans.

Durfa 
A Nuru town which is the base of the Nuru military force. It is also one of the town that makes up The Seven Rivers Kingdom alongside Chassa, Suntown, Sahara, Ronsi, Wa-wa, and Zin and one of the wealthiest town with its residents having electricity and Okada (scooters). Due to its size and wealth it needed Okeke slaves to do its work but with them gone, Nuru from poorer regions did the Job. Ewus are considered to be abominations and would be killed if caught by the residents.

Society
 Okeke: Brown skinned people who are killed mainly in the West by the Nuru people and sometimes the women are raped. The Okeke started a revolution against the Nuru who view them as their slaves and evil people leading to ongoing conflict. Okorafor states that the Okeke are Africans.
 Nuru: Light skinned people who attack and invade the Okeke territories because they believe that the goddess Ani made the Okeke to serve them. The Nuru decides to destroy the Okeke internally by raping their women and bringing Ewu children. Okorafor has also clarified that the Nuru are of Arab descent.
 Ewu: Mixed race children who are product of rape of  the Okeke women by Nuru men. They are described as having skin that matches the color of the desert sand. They are subject of discrimination by both the Okeke and Nuru who deem them as children of violence who are evil and unfit for the society.
 Vah: A mythological nomadic tribe that travels across the desert sandstorm and is hidden from the rest of the world. They are often referred to as "The Red People", their skin is described to be "red as palm oil" and their hair is reddish brown.

Themes and influences
Nnedi Okorafor started writing the novel after her father's death, the first scene of the novel was inspired by Okorafor's moments at her father's wake. The novel was also inspired in part by Emily Wax's 2004 Washington Post article "We Want to Make a Light Baby," which discussed the use of weaponized rape by Arab militiamen against Black African women in the Darfur conflict. According to Wax: "The victims and others said the rapes seemed to be a systematic campaign to humiliate the women, their husbands and fathers, and to weaken tribal ethnic lines." Okorafor wrote that this article "created the passageway through which Onyesonwu slipped through my world."

Okorafor based most of the traditional mysticism and beliefs on the traditional belief of the Igbo people, which she is a member of. The mythological Vah or "The Red People" was inspired by two red skinned Nigerian women Okorafor saw on two occasions during her visit to her home in Nigeria.

The novel contains several references to Amos Tutuola's novel The Palm-Wine Drinkard.

Reception 
The book received generally positive reception from reviewers and readers. A starred review from Publishers Weekly called the novel "A fantastical, magical blend of grand storytelling". A review from The Washington Post noted that the book was "both wondrously magical and terribly realistic".  Another review from The York Journal of Books states that "To compare author Nnedi Okorafor to the late Octavia E. Butler would be easy to do, but this simple comparison should not detract from Okorafor’s unique storytelling gift."

Besides winning the 2011 World Fantasy Award for Best Novel and the 2010 Carl Brandon Kindred Award, Who Fears Death was nominated for the 2011 Nebula Award for Best Novel and the 2011 Locus Award for Best Fantasy Novel. It also won the Best Foreign Novel award at the French Awards "Les Imaginales". Time ranked the novel as one of the 100 Best Fantasy Book of All Time.

The novel includes a graphic scene in which Onyesonwu is subjected to female genital mutilation (FGM), which she later learns may affect her magical powers. Steven Barnes of the American Book Review noted some had criticized the scene. In a blog post, Okorafor commented that she is proud of her Igbo identity, but that "culture is alive and it is fluid. It is not made of stone nor is it absolute. Some traditions/practices will be discarded and some will be added, but the culture still remains what it is. It is like a shape-shifting octopus that can lose a tentacle but still remain a shape-shifting octopus (yes, that image is meant to be complicated). Just because I believe that aspects of my culture are problematic does not mean I am "betraying" my people by pointing out those problems." She added: "What it [i.e., female genital cutting] all boils down to (and I believe the creators of this practice KNEW this even a thousand years ago) is the removal of a woman’s ability to properly enjoy the act of sex. Again, this is about the control and suppression of women."

TV Adaptation
In July 2017, Okorafor announced the novel was the basis for an HBO television series in "early development", with George R. R. Martin serving as an executive producer; Selwyn Seyfu Hinds has been selected as scriptwriter. In January 2021 it was announced that Tessa Thompson's newly formed production company, Viva Maude, had joined the team.

See also
 Yeelen, a Malian film with similar subject matter.

References

External links
 

Nigerian science fiction novels
2010 American novels
Novels set in Sudan
Post-apocalyptic novels
World Fantasy Award for Best Novel-winning works
American science fiction novels
Africanfuturist novels
Novels by Nnedi Okorafor
Magic realism novels
American fantasy novels
Nigerian fantasy novels
Female genital mutilation
2010 Nigerian novels
Science fantasy novels
DAW Books books